Aourir (Berber: Awrir, ⴰⵡⵔⵉⵔ) is a town and rural commune in Morocco, situated in the suburban area of Agadir (at 12 km from the city of Agadir). According to the 2004 census the town had a population of 21,796 inhabitants. It produces an important quantity of bananas.

References

Populated places in Agadir-Ida Ou Tanane Prefecture
Rural communes of Souss-Massa